Ned Joel Block (born 1942) is an American philosopher working in philosophy of mind who has made important contributions to the understanding of consciousness and the philosophy of cognitive science.  He has been professor of philosophy and psychology at New York University since 1996.

Education and career
Block obtained his PhD from Harvard University in 1971 under the direction of Hilary Putnam. He joined the Massachusetts Institute of Technology (MIT) as an assistant professor of philosophy (1971–1977), and then served as associate professor of philosophy (1977–1983), professor of philosophy (1983–1996) and as chair of the philosophy section (1989–1995). He has, since 1996, been a professor in the departments of philosophy and psychology at New York University (NYU).

Block received the Jean Nicod Prize in 2013, and has given the William James Lectures at Harvard University in 2012 and the John Locke Lectures at Oxford University in 2013, among many others.

Block is Past President of the Society for Philosophy and Psychology and was elected a Fellow of the American Academy of Arts & Sciences in 2004.

He is married to the developmental psychologist Susan Carey. Block is ethnically Jewish.

Philosophical work

Block is noted for presenting the Blockhead argument against the Turing test as a test of intelligence in a paper titled "Psychologism and Behaviorism" (1981). He is also known for his criticism of functionalism, arguing that a system with the same functional states as a human is not necessarily conscious. In his more recent work on consciousness, he has made a distinction between phenomenal consciousness and access consciousness, where phenomenal consciousness consists of subjective experience and feelings and access consciousness consists of that information globally available in the cognitive system for the purposes of reasoning, speech and high-level action control. He has argued that access consciousness and phenomenal consciousness might not always coincide in human beings.

Block has been a judge at the Loebner Prize contest, a contest in the tradition of the Turing Test to determine whether a conversant is a computer or a human.

See also
American philosophy
List of American philosophers
New York University Department of Philosophy

References

External links
NYU Department of Philosophy home page
Discussion of Block in a Wikibook about consciousness
Minds and Machines course by Ned Block

1942 births
Living people
20th-century American philosophers
21st-century American philosophers
Jewish philosophers
Harvard University alumni
American consciousness researchers and theorists
New York University faculty
Philosophers of mind
Philosophers from New York (state)
Fellows of the Cognitive Science Society